This article is a list of suburbs and settlements that make up the City of Townsville in Queensland, Australia. They are listed relative to their historical local government area from prior to 2008 when City of Townsville and City of Thuringowa were separate local government areas. For the main article/s, see Townsville, and City of Townsville.

Greater Townsville
Townsville City
Aitkenvale
Annandale
Belgian Gardens
Castle Hill
Cluden
Cosgrove
Cranbrook
Currajong
Douglas1
Garbutt
Gulliver
Heatley
Hermit Park
Hyde Park
Idalia
Mount Louisa
Mount St John
Mount Stuart
Mundingburra
Murray2
Mysterton
North Ward
Oonoonba
Pallarenda
Pimlico
Railway Estate
Rosslea
Rowes Bay
South Townsville
Stuart
Town Common
Townsville West
Vincent
West End
Wulguru

Rural Townsville
Alligator Creek
Barringha
Beach Holm (beach)
Bluehills
Brookhill
Calcium
Cape Cleveland
Clemant
Crimea
Crystal Creek
Cungulla
Granite Vale
Gumlow
Hervey Range
Hidden Valley
Julago
Lynam
Majors Creek
Mount Elliot
Nome
Oak Valley
Orpheus Island
Palm Island
Partington
Purono Park (beach)
Rangewood
Roseneath
Ross River
Rupertswood
Stuart
Toonpan
Woodstock
Islands
 Magnetic Island
Arcadia
Florence Bay
Horseshoe Bay
Nelly Bay
Picnic Bay

Urban Thuringowa
Alice River
Bluewater (beach)
Bohle
Bohle Plains
Bushland Beach (beach)
Condon
Deeragun (beach)
Kelso
Kirwan
Pinnacles
Rasmussen
Thuringowa Central
Rural Thuringowa
Balgal Beach
Black River (beach)
Bluewater Park
Burdell (beach)
Jensen (beach)
Mount Low (beach)
Mutarnee
Paluma
Rollingstone
Saunders Beach (beach)
Shaw
Toolakea (beach)
Toomulla
Yabulu (beach)

1 - includes James Cook University
2 - includes Lavarack Barracks

External links
 National Toilet Map: List of suburbs
 Suburbs in Townsville

Townsville